Robert Lindstedt and Horia Tecău successfully defended their title after defeating Colin Fleming and Igor Zelenay 6–2, 6–1 in the final.

Seeds

Draw

Draw

External links
 Main Draw

Grand Prix Hassan II - Doubles
2011 Grand Prix Hassan II